Medical-surgical nursing is a nursing specialty area concerned with the care of adult patients in a broad range of settings.  The Academy of Medical-Surgical Nurses (AMSN) is a specialty nursing organization dedicated to nurturing medical-surgical nurses as they advance their careers.  Traditionally, medical-surgical nursing was an entry-level position that most nurses viewed as a stepping stone to specialty areas.  Medical-surgical nursing is the largest group of professionals in the field of nursing. Advances in medicine and nursing have resulted in medical-surgical nursing evolving into its own specialty.

Many years ago a majority of hospital nurses worked on wards, and everyone was a medical-surgical nurse. Today licensed medical-surgical nurses work in a variety of positions, inpatient clinics, emergency departments, HMO’s, administration, out patient surgical centers, home health care, humanitarian relief work, ambulatory surgical care, and skilled nursing homes. Some military medical-surgical nurses serve on battlefields.

Registered nurses can become certified medical-surgical nurses through the American Nurses Credentialing Center. and also through the Medical-Surgical Nursing Certification Board's (MSNCB) (msncb.org) Certified Medical-Surgical Registered Nurse (CMSRN) credential.

See also
Medical surgical nursing certification

References 

Hospital nursing